The 1924 United States presidential election in Wisconsin was held on November 4, 1924 as part of the 1924 United States presidential election. State voters chose 13 electors to the Electoral College, who voted for president and vice president.

At the beginning of the campaign in July, La Follette listed nine states as “in” for him, including Wisconsin. Although early opinion polls showed La Follette attracting large numbers of those German and Scandinavian-Americans who completely deserted Cox in 1920, newer polls later in the fall showed Wisconsin as the only state La Follette was certain to carry. These later polls proved correct, with La Follette carrying Wisconsin with 53.96 percent of the popular vote, but winning no other state.

La Follette carried 62 of Wisconsin’s 72 counties, with Coolidge gaining majorities only in the heavily Yankee and pro-establishment counties bordering Illinois, in Pepin County on the western border, and in Marinette and Florence Counties bordering Michigan.

, this is the last time a third-party presidential candidate has carried a state outside the former Confederacy.

This was the first presidential election in which a Republican won the White House without carrying Wisconsin, a feat which would not occur again until 1988, when George H.W. Bush lost the state.

Background
Wisconsin had since the decline of the Populist movement been substantially a one-party state dominated by the Republican Party. The Democratic Party became entirely uncompetitive outside certain German Catholic counties adjoining Lake Michigan as the upper classes, along with the majority of workers who followed them, completely fled from William Jennings Bryan’s agrarian and free silver sympathies. As Democratic strength weakened severely after 1894 – although the state did develop a strong Socialist Party to provide opposition to the GOP – Wisconsin developed the direct Republican primary in 1903 and this ultimately created competition between the “League” under Robert M. La Follette, and the conservative “Regular” faction.

The beginning of the 1910s would see a minor Democratic revival as many La Follette progressives endorsed Woodrow Wilson, but this flirtation would not be long-lasting as Wilson’s “Anglophile” foreign policies were severely opposed by Wisconsin’s largely German- and Scandinavian-American populace. The 1918 mid-term elections saw the Midwestern farming community largely desert the Democratic Party due to supposed preferential treatment of Southern farmers: Democratic seats in the Midwest fell from thirty-four to seventeen, and in 1920 Wisconsin’s status as a one-party Republican state was solidified as James M. Cox won less than a sixth of the state’s presidential vote and Democrats claimed only four state legislative seats, all but one of which would be lost in 1922.

At the same time, the Republican Party both at the state and national levels was severely divided between an ascendant conservative faction and a progressive faction, whose leader was Wisconsin’s own veteran senator Robert M. La Follette. After a fierce debate the Democratic Party nominated former Congressman John W. Davis of West Virginia, who although West Virginia was a border state whose limited African-American population had not been disenfranchised as happened in all former Confederate States, shared the extreme social conservatism of Southern Democrats of the time. Davis supported poll taxes, opposed women's suffrage, and believed in strictly limited government with no expansion in nonmilitary fields.

The conservatism of the major-party nominees made La Follette mount a third-party challenge, which he had planned even beforehand. Wisconsin’s Senator was formally nominated on July 4 by the "Conference for Progressive Political Action" and developed a platform dedicated to eliminating child labor and American interference in Latin American political affairs, along with a formal denunciation of the Ku Klux Klan. La Follette also proposed major judicial reforms including amendments allowing congress to override judicial review and to re-enact laws declared unconstitutional. La Follette also called for election of federal judges for ten-year terms.

Results

Results by county

See also
 United States presidential elections in Wisconsin

Notes

References

Wisconsin
1924
1924 Wisconsin elections